RNLB  Thomas McCunn (ON 759) is a  lifeboat stationed at Longhope in Orkney, Scotland, from January 1933 until April 1962. During which time she was launched on service 101 times and saved 308 lives. After Thomas McCunn left Longhope she was placed into the reserve fleet for ten years before being sold and used as a pleasure boat. In 2000 she was bought by Longhope Lifeboat Museum. The lifeboat is now at the centre of a display in the old slipway at Brims and is still launched on special occasions.

Design and construction
Thomas McCunn was built at the yard of Groves and Guttridge Ltd on the Isle of Wight, England. Her hull is constructed using double diagonal planking of Honduras Mahogany on a framework of Teak ribs and beams with the stem and stern posts and her keel of English oak. The stern and stem posts are grown to the required shape to give the lifeboat its strength and sturdiness. The hull is divided into seven watertight compartments, of which the engine room is one. The hull is fitted with 142 mahogany air cases, all individually made to fit into its allocated position in the hull. Her equipment included the latest innovations of the time which included a line throwing gun and an electrically powered searchlight.

Engines
The lifeboat was originally powered by two 40bhp 4-cylinder Weyburn CE4 petrol engines, but after sale by the RNLI was re-engined in 1973 with two Ford Mermaid diesel engines.  The last of the petrol engines was designed by Watson himself. The lifeboat had a top speed of

Service

The boat served from January 1933 - April 1962 at Longhope. During this time it was launched 101 times and saved 308 lives.
From 1962 - 1972 it was a reserve-boat and has 8 launches with 7 savings during this time. In August 1972 the boat was sold and returned later to Longhope for display.

References

1933 ships
Tourist attractions in Orkney
History of Orkney
1933 establishments in Scotland
Museum ships in the United Kingdom
Ships and vessels on the National Register of Historic Vessels
Watson-class lifeboats